is a Japanese amateur astronomer, discoverer of minor planets, and, by profession, a junior high school science teacher. As a planetarian, a member of the professional staff of a planetarium, he has done much for the spread of astronomy in Japan through speaking on planetaria and the results of astronomical observation.

In 2001, while working as support staff at JK1ZAM, the club station of Iruma Children’s Center (an educational institution for children in Iruma City), he helped achieve the first ARISS school contact in Japan. Also, in 2003, as a coordinating teacher, he helped accomplish the first solo contact between a junior high school in Japan and the ISS, with the support of JK1ZAM. He regularly spoke on the astronomical talk program Sunset Café at the local radio station "FM CHAPPY 77.7" from December 2006 to November 2008. He held the position of vice-director on the board of the Saitama Planetarium Liaison Council (2007–2008). He supports ARISS (Amateur Radio on the International Space Station), which is a program that offers students an opportunity to experience the excitement of amateur radio by talking directly with crew members of the ISS (International Space Station).

The Eos main-belt asteroid 6025 Naotosato, which Takeshi Urata discovered in 1992, was named after him.

Discoveries of minor planets 

Since 1995, Satō has discovered a large number of minor planets from his own Chichibu Astronomical Observatory at Chichibu, including asteroids such as 7038 Tokorozawa, 7851 Azumino, 8581 Johnen, 8924 Iruma, 9418 Mayumi and 118230 Sado. He is ranked among the top 50 asteroid discoverers in the world (The Astronomy Yearbook – 2008). The Minor Planet Center credits him with the discovery of 142 minor planets during 1995–1998, of which 18 were co-discoveries with astronomer Takeshi Urata (also see table). Naoto Satō is also known for the prediscovery of C/1989 Y2, a parabolic comet credited to McKenzie–Russell.

List

See also 
 List of minor planet discoverers

References 
 

1953 births
Discoverers of asteroids

20th-century Japanese astronomers
Living people